Peyriac-Minervois is a commune in the Aude department in southern France.

Population

Notable residents

 Louis Barthas (1879–1952), socialist, anti-militarist, barrelmaker and World War I diarist
 Hippolyte Babou (1824-1878), journalist, critic and novelist

See also
Communes of the Aude department

References

Communes of Aude
Aude communes articles needing translation from French Wikipedia